Daily Air Corporation is an airline with its headquarters in Songshan District, Taipei, Taiwan. It operates scheduled passenger services to offshore islands from Taiwan, including Penghu, Green Island and Orchid Island, as well as helicopter contract services and charters. Its main base is Taipei Songshan Airport, with hubs at Kaohsiung International Airport and Taitung Airport.

History 
The airline was established in 1992 as a helicopter operator. Aircraft services began 8 June 2005.  The airline is owned by Sincere and Durban Shopping Mall, Miramar Entertainment Park, DC Development (Construction) Group, Mayer Steel Pipe, Tze Shin Transportation and Terminal and Far Eastern Air Transport (5%).  It has 100 employees, as of March 2007. Daily Air operates flights primarily to domestic destinations in Taiwan.

Destinations

Fleet 

The Daily Air fleet consists of the following aircraft (as of December 2019):

Incidents and accidents 
 On 13 April 2017, Flight 55571, a DHC-6, overran the runway and crashed into a guard rail in Lanyu Airport in Taitung County. None of the people on board were hurt.
 On 7 June 2017, a Daily Air-operated DHC-6-400 experienced malfunction in its front landing gear. No person on board was hurt.

See also 

 List of companies of Taiwan
 List of airlines of Taiwan
 Air transport in Taiwan
 List of airports in Taiwan
 Transportation in Taiwan

References

External links 

 Daily Air (Chinese)
 English (Archive)

1992 establishments in Taiwan
Airlines of Taiwan
Airlines established in 1992